Maharajadhiraj Prithvi Narayan Shah (1723–1775) was the last ruler of the Gorkha Kingdom and first monarch of the Kingdom of Nepal (also called Kingdom of Gorkha). Prithvi Narayan Shah started the unification of Nepal.

Shah proclaimed the newly unified Kingdom of Nepal as Asal Hindustan ("Real Land of Hindus") due to North India being ruled by the Islamic Mughal rulers. He also referred to the rest of Northern India as Mughlan (Country of Mughals). Prithvi Narayan Shah is  considered as the Father of the Nation in Nepal.

Early years 

Prithvi Narayan Shah was born prematurely on 7 January 1723 as the first child of Nara Bhupal Shah and Kaushalyavati Devi in the Gorkha Palace.
Prince Prithvi Narayan Shah's education began at age five through the appropriate ceremony. At that time, the responsibility to educate him was given to Mokchyeshwor Aryal and Bhanu Aryal, They were the Upadhyayas who worked in the palace as astrologers, where they were also known as Jyotishi or Jaisi. Even though the Gurus provided his primary education, the duty of developing his character was taken by Queen Chandra Pravawati. It is said that seeing the prince of neighboring states Tanahun, Lamjung, and Kaski indulged in excess pleasure, Chandra Pravawati kept Prithvi Narayan Shah away from pleasurable and wrong pursuits. That is why no traces of pleasurable pursuits and diversion can be found in his early life. 

From a young age, he took interest in the affairs of his father's state and soon began to take on these responsibilities. Prithvi Narayan Shah had an early dream of conquering Nuwakot, partially as his father had lost it to the Mallas of Kathmandu in an earlier war. After the death of his father in 1743 AD, Prithvi Narayan Shah ascended to the throne of Gorkha at the age of 20. As king, he valued his people and enjoyed talking to his subjects about their general concerns. This practice helped him to build a rapport with his people and helped him to understand the requirements of the citizens of Gorkha. King Shah sealed his borders and maintained a friendly diplomatic relationship with his neighbors, with the exception of the East India Company, which ignored Nepal and refused to open trade relationships at the time.

Reign 
Before Prithvi Narayan Shah's unification movement, there were a total of 54 states in Nepal. In the South-Eastern Terai, there were three Sen states: Makawanpur, Bijayapur, and Chaudandi. In the West, from Gorkha to Gandaki Province, there were 24 states. In the province of Karnali, there were 22 states with Kalyan, Samaal, Shahi and Chand dynasties. Along with Gorkha and Mustang, Bhaktapur, Kantipur and Lalitpur made up the remaining five states. When Prithvi Narayan Shah had ascended to the throne of Gorkha in the year 3 April 1743 A.D, it was yet a small state. He then started to contemplate the methods to turn Gorkha into a huge and strong state. He went to Varanasi to gain first-hand knowledge about the neighbouring states and about India to the south. During those days, Varanasi was one of the large trade centres of India where people from different places gathered. He met with different types of people and gained valuable understandings regarding the Political and Social conditions of the Indian Sub-Continent. In Varanasi, his father-in-law Abhiman Singh, a Rajput Chief, procured for him some firearms and a quantity of ammunition.

Nuwakot 

His first attempt at invasion of Nuwakot in 1743 CE failed and his reign began with an immediate military defeat. Conquering Nuwakot was essential for the unification, as it lay between Kathmandu and the Gorkha District, making it a vital trading route to Tibet.

On his return to Gorkha from Varanasi, Prithvi Narayan Shah first took steps to defeat Nuwakot in the diplomatic field. He entered into friendly alliance with the chiefs of Lamjung , Tanahun and Palpa. This done, Prithvi Narayan Shah sent an army against Nuwakot from three directions. The Chief of Nuwakot knowing that Gorkha is going to attack them in near future had gone to take help from Jaya Prakash Malla, the king of Kantipur. Thus his son Jayant Rana commanded the Nuwakot army representing his father. The Nuwakot army was defeated in 1744 CE and his country passed into the hands of Prithvi Narayan Shah's Gorkhas.

Kirtipur 

Prithvi Narayan Shah's next strategy was to conquer all the places around the Nepal valley, that is, Kathmandu and the neighboring regions, and thereby to create an economic crisis in order that the conquest of Nepal valley might become easier. He first attacked Kirtipur, a dependency of Patan and a strategic post commanding the Nepal valley, but was signally defeated (1757). He made a narrow escape from the battlefield but his minister Kalu Pande was killed. Pande's death meant a great loss to the Gorkhas and it was not until 1763 that they were in a position to resume the policy of conquest.

In 1765, Prithvi Narayan Shah attacked Kirtipur again after two humiliating defeats. In Kirtipur, King Prithvi Narayan conquered the ancient city on his third attempt. The ferocity with which the conquerors had dealt with the natives of Kirtipur struck terror into the hearts of the neighbouring people and made the conquest easier.

Makwanpur

In 1763, the Gorkhas conquered Makwanpur, one of the gateways to Nepal from Bengal. The conquest of Makwanpur, however, brought Prithvi Narayan Shah in a collision with Mir Qasim, the Nawab of Bengal. Bikram Sen, the king of Makwanpur, was then taken prisoner by Prithvi Narayan Shah. Upon this Kanak Singh, another local Chief complained to Nawab Mir Qasim and requested his intervention. "In consequence of this complaint, the Nabab himself crossed over sending Gurgin Khan before him who arrived near Makwanpur where his whole army being destroyed the Nabab returned to Patna". The expedition of Qasim was also determined by Gurgin Khan's eagerness to test the strength and skill of the troops who he had disciplined and of the artillery which he had trained. Gurgin Khan's lust for the Nepalese gold was another cause of his earnestness to lead the expedition, although the Nawab had counselled against it. Gurgin Khan lost a great number of his men and had to leave many stands of arms.

Chaukot 
The Gorkhalis fought for six months with the people of Dhulikhel. After this Prithvi Narayan Shah built a fort on the top of the hill south of Chaukot and collected a large number of troops. On consulting with his followers, he was told by the kajis that small villages were easily taken, as the people fled when they heard the shouts of the assailants, but the village of Chaukot required special military skills. After this, consultation the troops blockaded Chaukot. Some of the people fled to Pyuthan by way of Basdol, and others to their places. Narasinha Rai went to Mahindra Sinha Rai and said, "We are unable to cope with the Gorkhalis with the help of fifty houses. The rest of the people have fled, and I have come to tell you. Do not delay but flee soon". Mahindra Sinha reproached him and charged him with cowardice, saying, "Do not stay for me but escape with your lives. As for myself, I will repulse the whole force of the Gorkhalis, and having earned great renown, will enjoy my possession in happiness. If I do not succeed, I shall leave my body on the field of battle and earn an abode in heaven, by the merit of which my sons and grandsons will obtain happiness." He then called together his faithful followers, who were desirous of securing happiness in the next world and encouraged them.

On the 6th of Jestha (28 May 1757), a severe battle was fought, which lasted from evening till 12 gharis (12 o' clock) of the night. The Gorkhalis, having lost 131 men, retreated. The battle was renewed daily for fifteen days, without the Gorkhalis making any impression. On the 6th of Jeth Sudi a hardly contested battle was fought, which lasted till 14 gharis of the night. At this time a soldier, getting behind Mahindra Sinha, killed him with a khoda and a lance and wounded Narasinha in the left shoulder with a Khukuri, due to which he fell senseless to the ground. Seeing this, the Chaukotiyas fled, and the village was set on fire. In this battle, the Gorkhalis lost 201 men, which, with the 131 killed on the former day, gives the total of 332 men.

The next morning Prithvi Narayan Shah inspected the field of battle, and seeing Mahindra Sinha Rai's lifeless body pierced with wounds, he praised his bravery and sent for his family, that they being the relative of so brave a man, might have proper protection. They were brought and fed in the royal kitchen. After this, having with ease taken five villages, viz., Panauti, Banepa, Nala, Khadpu, and Sanga, Prithvi Narayan Shah returned to Nuwakot.

Kathmandu Valley 

After this, he intended to take possession of the Kathmandu Valley. Prithvi Narayan Shah's conquest of the whole of Nepal was rendered easier by the internal dissensions among the Nepali rulers. Ranjit Malla, the chief of Bhadgaon, invoked the assistance of the Gorkha Chief due to his feud with the chiefs of Patan and Kathmandu. Prithvi Narayan Shah had previously gained over the Satbahalyas of Ranjit Malla by promising to leave them the throne and the revenue to content himself with nominal sovereignty over the country.

Prithvi Narayan Shah took possession of Bhadgaon and next he invested in Patan in 1767. The rapid expansion of the Gorkha dominions and the growth of the Gorkha power round the Nepal valley placed Jaya Prakash Malla, the Chief of Kathmandu in a state of siege. All egress and ingress having been stopped, Kathmandu faced the danger of being starved into submission. The valley was completely cut off from the outside world and was controlled solely by Shah. Having understood that the Gorkhas cannot be defeated by his army alone, Jaya Prakash in this predicament sought military assistance from the Bengal Presidency by sending one of his messengers to Patna in order to ask for help with the East India Company. The officers in Patna of the East India Company sent the message to Bengal. The East India Company seized the opportunity and sent a warning to Prithvi Narayan Shah and decided to send an expedition to relieve Jaya Prakash.

According to legends, when Prithvi Narayan Shah entered the durbar of Bhadgaon, he found the kings of three towns sitting together, whereat he and his companions laughed. Jaya Prakash was offended by this, and said, "O Gorkhalis, this has come to pass through the treachery of our servants, or else you would have had no cause for mirth." Prithvi Narayan Shah having conversed with Jaya Prakash Malla for a while then paid his respects to Ranjit Malla, and respectfully asked him to continue to rule as he had hitherto done, although Prithvi Narayan Shah had conquered the country. Ranjit Malla said that Prithvi Narayan Shah had obtained the sovereignty by the favor of God and that all that he now asked for was to be sent to Benaras. Shah entreated him to remain, but the recollection of the treachery of the servants was fresh in his memory and he would not be consent. Shah granted him the leave along with the expenses used for the journey. When Ranjit Malla reached the top of the Chandragiri Paa, he took a last view of Nepal, and with tears in his eyes exclaimed, " The Satbahalyas have killed my son Bir Narsinha, and have caused me this sorrow. " He then bade farewell to Taleju, Pashupatinath, and Guhyeshwari, and went to seek an asylum with Bisweswaranatha and Ganga.

He also occupied the Kuti Pass in circa 1756 CE, halting all trade through the pass and preventing communication with Tibet.

Kinloch expedition 

After the loss, Jaya Prakash Malla, out of sheer desperation, sent Nepali Vakeels to Mr. Golding, the Commercial Agent of the East India Company at Bettiah, to solicit their help against Prithvi Narayan Shah. The purport of the conversation between the Nepali Vakeels and Golding was communicated to Thomas Rumbold, the company's chief at Patna, on 6 April 1767. Golding had made a strong case for sending an expedition to the relief of Jaya Prakash Malla. According to him, if Malla was successfully relieved, the East India Company would earn his gratitude which would facilitate the opening of communication with China through Nepal and this would be of great consequence to the company. Malla was offering to bear all costs of the expedition.

In the meantime, Prithvi Narayan Shah had already realized the danger of a military alliance between Malla and the East India Company. Shah then sent a letter to Rumbold requesting his protection for a visit to Patna. Rumbold then communicated Shah's request to the president of the Select Committee. The Select Committee under the persuasion of Golding decided to instead send military assistance to Jaya Prakash Malla.

The Select Committee directed George Kinloch, who had been earlier sending on an expedition against the Raja of Tipperah, to proceed to Patna so that he might be in readiness to lead the expedition against Prithvi Narayan Shah. The considerations that weighted with the Selection Committee to decide in favour of sending military assistance to Jaya Prakash Malla can be gathered from their letters. The revival of the declining, almost dead, trade relations with Nepal and the opening up of China trade through Nepali territory were two of the prime considerations. Under instructions from the Select Committee Capt. Kinloch proceeded to Patna where he was asked to await further instructions from Mr. Rumbold. Pursuant to the committee's decision to render the military assistance, Mr Rumbold and Capt. Kinloch was busy gathering all relevant information that was likely to help the expedition to success. In the meantime, Prithvi Narayan Shah was peremptorily asked to accept the East India Company mediation to which he sent an evasive reply.

In June 1767, The Nepali Vakeels Muktananda and Faqir Ramdoss who came to solicit East India Company help on behalf of Jaya Prakash Malla were examined by Capt. Kinloch at Patna with a view to eliciting every information of military importance. The strength of Prithvi Narayan Shah's troops, as the Vakeels said, was near about 50,000 of which again, only 20,000 were stationed in the Nepal valley and the rest was engaged in cultivation in their native places. Their arms comprised bows and arrows, swords and matchlocks. The Vakeels also made no secret of the fact that there was no time to lose, as the break of monsoon the hilly paths would become unsafe and the hill rivers unforeseeable. They also informed Capt. Kinloch how Prithvi Narayan Shah had "taken ten principal cities and possession of all his (Jaya Prakash's) country" and had kept the towns of Kathmandu, Patan, Bhadgaun, and Zeemy (sic) all closely blockaded".

The total distance to be covered by the expeditionary force was 96 coss (384000 yards) and the journey had to be completed by eleven stages, during the last six stages of which the Nepal Rajah undertook to provide porters and provisions.

The expedition, however, miscarried and the high hopes of the Select Committee were dashed to the ground. The reasons for the failure were set forth in a series of letter that passed between Capt. Kinloch and Mr. Rumbold, the latter, the Select Committee and the Court of Directors. The first reason mentioned the destruction of the major part of their provisions by a sudden torrent from the hills. The other reason was that no help in respect to provisions came from the Nepal Rajah and when Capt. Kinloch had reached Janakpur assurances of abundant supply were given by the men of the Rajah once the troops would reach Sindhuli where the seventh stage of the journey would have ended. But even there, the promised help didn't come. "Famine stared them in the face. Retreat under the present circumstances was out of the question and it was impossible to hold Sindhuli for long as all supplies of provisions had been cut off by the enemy (Prithvi Narayan Shah). But as Kinloch insisted the troops had to face the holy river Bagmati. The troops had built an improvised bridge and rafts but the violent torrent washed them down before any army could cross the river. Famished and falling sick in an increasingly large number, the troops had no way out but to order an immediate retreat. The retreating troops, however, were hotly pursued by the Gorkhas sent by Prithvi Narayan Shah. Capt. Kinloch then, at last, returned to the Terai and occupied the territories of Bara, Parsa and Hilwall. The miscarriage of the Kinloch expedition allowed Prithvi Narayan Shah to deal with the besieged capitals of Kathmandu, Patan, Bhadgaon, etc. By the end of the year 1768, he had succeeded in reducing all the cities that still held out. "Prithvi Narayan Shah almost walked into Kathmandu due to the Indra Jatra revelry in which the Nepali were sunk".

Divyopadesh 

Towards the end of his life, Prithvi Narayan Shah was troubled by illness to a great extent. He had probably started to realize his end was near, which is why he decided to organize an unofficial council meeting known as bhardaari-sabha. In this sabha he decided to inform his brothers, his son and his ministers on why was he involved in the unification of Nepal and what should the appropriate policies and programs for the future be regarding Nepal. This sabha continued for the whole day for about 5/6 hours. The messages he gave in this sabha was written down by his brothers and ministers and was compiled as Divyopadesh.

Foreign policy 
Prithvi Narayan Shah considered the state of Nepal as a ' Yam between two boulders ', referring to China on the North and the 'Emperor of Seas' to the South. He suggested that Nepal should forever maintain a good friendship with China. In regards to his policy towards the East India Company's rule, however, he suggested maintaining friendliness but also to be wary of their shrewdness. Shah opined that "The East India Company is currently occupying Hindustan forcefully...If the Hindustanis wake-up then they will come here in search of safe forts". Hence, Prithvi Narayan Shah connoted his soldiers to be prepared and build barriers and forts at appropriate locations.

Religion 
Prithvi Narayan Shah was born into a Hindu family. After he became the master of Kathmandu proper, he began to follow his policy of exclusion and expulsion of the Europeans with all strictness. The Capuchin missionaries who were residing in Nepal for a long time and who had been successfully converting people and also gaining lands from the Malla Kings were expelled from Nepal. He called Nepal the actual 'Hindustan.' He advised the citizens of Nepal to never leave the traditional dharma of the ancestors.

Economic policy 
Prithvi Narayan Shah strongly emphasized local production. In his Divya Upadesh, he was of the idea that if foreign traders enter Nepal then they will suck the country dry. In the same context, he suggested a boycott on wearing foreign clothes and also promotes the training of the local people to weave clothes. He believed that by doing so, the local wealth would not be allowed to reach out of the country. He encouraged the selling of Nepali herbs to foreign lands and bringing the wealth so attained back to the country. He also wanted the money to remain inside the country. He famously said, " प्रजा मोटो भए दरबार पनि बलियो रहन्छ " (If the people are capable then the palace will also remain stronger).

Defense policy 
King Prithvi Narayan Shah established the Nepal Army in August 1762 with Shreenath, Kali Baksh (Kalibox), Barda Bahadur, and Sabuj companies. Prithvi Narayan Shah emphasized the building of forts. He considered the land of Nepal as a natural fort created by God Himself. He suggested on building one strong fort each on Shivapuri, Phulchowki, Chandragiri, Mahadevpokhari, Palung, Daapcha, and Kaahule and placing cannon in each of them in a ready state. Construction of iron doors at the bhanjyangs and the placement of cannons in each of those doors, each in the ready state was also advocated by Prithvi Narayan Shah, which, he believed would keep the country safe from spies, refugees, murderers, etc.

Memorial 
Many structures, institutions and honors have been built in the memory of King Prithvinarayan Shah. Monuments erected in his name were renamed after the restoration of the parliament in 2063 BS and the end of the monarchy in 2065 BS. After the political changes of 2063 BS, an attempt was made to rename the highway built in the name of the king as Lok Marg. 

 Prithvi Highway
 Prithvi Rajpath
 Prithvi Statue (Singh Durbar)
 Prithvi Statue (Pashupatinath temple)
 Prithvi Memorial statue, Chandragiri
 Maharaja Prithvi Narayan Shah Memorial Foundation
 Prithvi Narayan Shah's Statue, Rastra Bibhuti Park, Pokhara
 Greater Nepal: Quest for Boundaries (Documentary)
 Prithvi Narayan Campus , Pokhara 
 Prithvi Museum
Prithvi Narayan Shah Statue, Sindhuli Gadi Fort

Death and legacy
King Prithvi Narayaṇ Shah was ultimately able to capture small principalities and annex them into the kingdom. This expansion was crucial to ensure the continued survival of the Kingdom of Nepal as the East India Company was already expanding into the Indian subcontinent from their base in Bengal. Shah was convinced that the company would eventually conquer the regions bordering Nepal to the south and approach Nepal. He believed that if Nepal remained a collection of fifty principalities, then it would easily be defeated and conquered in the event of a war with the company or any other foreign power. Expanding his kingdom ensured that Nepal would remain an independent state and be able to negotiate with a foreign power on equal terms.

In January 1775, at the age of 52, Prithvi Narayan Shah died at Devighat, Nuwakot on his birthday. Upon his death, his son, Pratap Singh Shah, succeeded him and his unification campaign was continued by his younger son, Bahadur Shah.

References

Shumsher, Purusottam (1993). Shree Tinharuko Tathya Britanta. Kathmandu: Pramod Shumsher.

External links

History of Nepal

|-

Prithvi Narayan Shah
1723 births
1775 deaths
18th-century monarchs in Asia
18th-century Nepalese people
Founding monarchs
Gurkhas
Hindu monarchs
National heroes of Nepal
Nepalese Hindus
Nepalese monarchs
People from Gorkha District
People of the Nepalese unification
Shah dynasty